Obergesteln is a village in the municipality of Obergoms in the district of Goms in the canton of Valais in Switzerland.

Obergesteln was an independent municipality until January 1, 2009, when it merged with Oberwald and Ulrichen to form the municipality Obergoms.

References

External links

 Official website 

Former municipalities of Valais